Basketball at the 2015 European Youth Summer Olympic Festival

Medal summary

Medal table

Medalist events

References

Basketball
Basketball at the European Youth Summer Olympic Festival
2015–16 in European basketball
2015–16 in Georgian basketball
International basketball competitions hosted by Georgia (country)